The economy of Kyrgyzstan is heavily dependent on the agricultural sector. Cotton, tobacco, wool, and meat are the main agricultural products, although only tobacco and cotton are exported in any quantity. According to Healy Consultants, Kyrgyzstan's economy relies heavily on the strength of industrial exports, with plentiful reserves of gold, mercury and uranium. The economy also relies heavily on remittances from foreign workers. Following independence, Kyrgyzstan was progressive in carrying out market reforms, such as an improved regulatory system and land reform. In 1998, Kyrgyzstan was the first Commonwealth of Independent States (CIS) country to be accepted into the World Trade Organization. Much of the government's stock in enterprises has been sold. Kyrgyzstan's economic performance has been hindered by widespread corruption, low foreign investment and general regional instability. Despite those issues, Kyrgyzstan is ranked 70th (as of 2019) on the ease of doing business index.

Finance

In October 2012, International reserves and Foreign Currency Liquidity of Kyrgyzstan National Bank have reached US$1.96 bln, 8.6% of which is in gold. In 2012, to diversify the assets of Kyrgyzstan, the basket of currencies has been expanded by means of the Chinese yuan and the Singapore dollar. In 2012, 1 billion soms are to be spent for the purchase of gold. Gold proportion in international reserves has already grown to 8.6%. The National Bank plans to increase it to 12-15% in future.

Industries

Agriculture

Agriculture remains a vital part of Kyrgyzstan's economy and a refuge for workers displaced from industry. Subsistence farming has increased in the early 2000s. After sharp reductions in the early 1990s, by the early 2000s agricultural production was approaching 1991 levels. Grain production in the lower valleys and livestock grazing on upland pastures occupy the largest share of the agricultural workforce. Farmers are shifting to grain and away from cotton and tobacco. Other important products are dairy products, hay, animal feed, potatoes, vegetables, and sugar beets. Agricultural output comes from private household plots (55 percent of the total), private farms (40 percent), and state farms (5 percent). Further expansion of the sector depends on banking reform to increase investment, and on market reform to streamline the distribution of inputs. Land reform, a controversial issue in Kyrgyzstan, has proceeded very slowly since initial legislation in 1998. The irrigation infrastructure is in poor condition. Agriculture contributes about one-third of the GDP and more than one-third of employment.

Kyrgyzstan produced in 2018:

 1.4 million tons of potato;
 773 thousand tons of sugar beet;
 692 thousand tons of maize;
 615 thousand tons of wheat;
 429 thousand tons of barley;
 224 thousand tons of tomato;
 218 thousand tons of watermelon;
 209 thousand tons of onion;
 176 thousand tons of carrot;
 147 thousand tons of cabbage;
 144 thousand tons of apple;
 119 thousand tons of cucumber;
 116 thousand tons of vegetable;
 101 thousand tons of bean;
 74 thousand tons of cotton;

In addition to smaller productions of other agricultural products, like apricot (25 thousand tons).

Forestry
Only 4 percent of Kyrgyzstan is classified as forested. All of that area is state-owned, and none is classified as available for wood supply. The main commercial product of the forests is walnuts.

Fishing

Kyrgyzstan does not have a significant fishing industry. In 2002 aquaculture contributed 66 percent of the country's total output of 142 metric tons of fish, but in 2003 the aquaculture industry collapsed, producing only 12 of the country's total of 26 metric tons.

Mining and minerals
In the post-Soviet era, mining has been an increasingly important economic activity. The Kumtor Gold Mine, which opened in 1997, is one of the largest gold deposits in the world. New gold mines are planned at Jerooy and Taldy–Bulak, and a major gold discovery was announced in late 2006 at Tokhtonysay. The state agency Kyrgyzaltyn owns all mines, many of which are operated as joint ventures with foreign companies. Uranium and antimony, important mineral outputs of the Soviet era, no longer are produced in significant amounts. Although between 1992 and 2003 coal output dropped from about 2.4 million tons to 411,000 tons, the government plans to increase exploitation of Kyrgyzstan's considerable remaining deposits (estimated at 2.5 billion tons) in order to reduce dependency on foreign energy sources. A particular target of this policy is the Kara–Keche deposit in northern Kyrgyzstan, whose annual output capability is estimated at between 500,000 and 1 million tons. The small domestic output of oil and natural gas does not meet national needs.

Industry and manufacturing
In the post-Soviet era, Kyrgyzstan's industries suffered sharp reductions in productivity because the supply of raw materials and fuels was disrupted, and Soviet markets disappeared. The sector has not recovered appreciably from that reduction; if gold production is not counted, in 2005 industry contributed only 14 percent of the gross domestic product (GDP). Investment and restructuring have remained at low levels, and the electricity industry (traditionally an important part of industry's contribution to GDP) has stagnated in recent years. Government support is moving away from the machine industries, which were a major contributor to the Soviet economy, toward clothing and textiles. Food processing accounted for 10 to 15 percent of industrial production until encountering a slump in 2004. In recent years, the glass industry has surpassed clothing and textiles in investment received and as a contributor to GDP. In the early 2000s, the construction industry has grown steadily because of large infrastructure projects such as highways and new gold mines. Housing construction, however, has lagged because of low investment.

Energy

More than ninety percent of electricity produced is hydroelectric and the country could produce much more of such clean energy and export to its neighbors and the region. Even though Kyrgyzstan has abundant hydro resources, only less than ten percent of its potential has been developed so far. It has limited deposits of fossil fuels and most of its natural gas imports come from Uzbekistan, with which Kyrgyzstan has had a series of imperfect barter agreements. Per capita energy consumption is high considering average income, and the government has no comprehensive plan to reduce demand. Up to 45 percent of electricity generated, especially in winter time, is diverted illegally or leaks from the distribution system. Hydroelectric plants generate some 92.5 percent of domestically consumed electricity, and three commercial thermoelectric plants are in operation. Because of its rich supply of hydroelectric power, Kyrgyzstan sends electricity to Kazakhstan and Uzbekistan in return for fossil fuels. A new hydroelectric plant on the Naryn River at Kambar–Ata would supply power to parts of China and Russia, improving Kyrgyzstan's export situation and domestic energy supply. The plant was completed on August 30, 2010. An antiquated infrastructure and poor management make Kyrgyzstan more dependent on foreign energy in winter when water levels are low. In the early 2000s, Kyrgyzstan was exploiting only an estimated 10 percent of its hydroelectric power potential. In 2001 Kyrgyzstan had about 70,000 kilometers of power transmission lines served by about 500 substations. Kyrgyzstan would be a member of the Shanghai Cooperation Organisation's Asian Energy Club, which Russia proposed in 2006 to unify oil, gas, and electricity producers, consumers, and transit countries in the Central Asian region in a bloc that is self-sufficient in energy. Other members would be China, Kazakhstan, Tajikistan, and Uzbekistan.

Kyrgyzstan is a partner country of the EU INOGATE energy programme, which has four key topics: enhancing energy security, convergence of member state energy markets on the basis of EU internal energy market principles, supporting sustainable energy development, and attracting investment for energy projects of common and regional interest.

The South Korean style manufactured bituminous coal called yeontan (йонтан) is gaining popularity in Kyrgyzstan's energy industrial scene.

Services

Substantial post-Soviet growth in the services sector is mainly attributable to the appearance of small private enterprises. The central bank is the National Bank of the Kyrgyz Republic, which nominally is independent but follows government policy. Although the banking system has been reformed several times since 1991, it does not play a significant role in investment. High interest rates have discouraged borrowing. A stock market opened in 1995, but its main function is trading in government securities. Because of the Akayev regime's economic reforms, many small trade and catering enterprises have opened in the post-Soviet era. Although Kyrgyzstan's mountains and lakes are an attractive tourist destination, the tourism industry has grown very slowly because it has received little investment. In the early 2000s, an average of about 450,000 tourists visited annually, mainly from countries of the former Soviet Union.

External trade

Kyrgyzstan's principal exports, which go overwhelmingly to other CIS countries, are nonferrous metals and minerals, woolen goods and other agricultural products, electric energy, and certain engineering goods. In turn, the Republic relies on other former Soviet states for petroleum and natural gas, ferrous metals, chemicals, most machinery, wood and paper products, some foods, and most construction materials. In 1999, Kyrgyz exports to the U.S. totaled $11.2 million, and imports from the U.S. totaled $54.2 million. In 2017, Kyrgyzstan exports were estimated to be worth $1.84 billion, while their imports were at an estimated $4.187 billion. Kyrgyzstan's major exports include gold, cotton, wool, garments, meat, mercury, uranium, electricity, machinery, and shoes. Major imports include oil and gas, machinery and equipment, chemicals, and foodstuffs.

Reexport of China-made consumer goods to Kazakhstan and Russia, centered on Dordoy Bazaar in Bishkek, and to Uzbekistan, centered on Kara-Suu Bazaar in Osh Region, is particularly important; it is thought by some economists to be one of the country's two largest economic activities.

The Kyrgyzstan Government has reduced expenditures, ended most price subsidies, and introduced a value added tax. Overall, the government appears committed to transferring to a free market economic system by stabilizing the economy and implementing reforms, which will encourage long-term growth. These reforms led to Kyrgyzstan's accession to the WTO on December 20, 1998.

Investment

The stock market capitalisation of listed companies in Kyrgyzstan was valued at $42 million in 2005 by the World Bank.

Taxation 
The tax regime in the Kyrgyz Republic is administered by the State Tax Service. Collected taxes reached 18.1% of GDP in 2012.

Macro-economic trend
This is a chart of trend of gross domestic product of Kyrgyzstan at market prices estimated by the International Monetary Fund and EconStats with figures in millions of Kyrgyz Soms.

For purchasing power parity comparisons, the international dollar is exchanged at 9.40 Soms only.

Current GDP per capita of Kyrgyzstan shrank by 54% in the 1990s. Mean wages were $0.85 per man-hour in 2009 and this rate represented underemployment when compared to effective market pay. In the first half of 2012, Kyrgyz economy shrank by 5.8%. This downturn was largely due to decline in gold production at the Kumtor mine.

The budget deficit in mid-2012 was 23-billion soms and accounted for 7% of GDP while the target was to reduce it to 6%.

The following table shows the main economic indicators in 1992–2017.

Other statistics 
Investment (gross fixed):
17% of GDP (2004 est.)

Household income or consumption by percentage share:
 lowest 10%: 3.9%
 highest 10%: 23.3% (2001)

Distribution of family income - Gini index:
27.3 (2017)

Agriculture - products:
tobacco, cotton, potatoes, vegetables, grapes, fruits and berries; sheep, goats, cattle, wool, dairy products

Industrial production growth rate:
6% (2000 est.)

Electricity
 production: 11,720 GWh (2002)
 consumption: 10,210 GWh (2002)
 exports: 1,062 GWh (2002)
 imports: 375 GWh (2002)

Electricity - production by source:
 fossil fuel: 7.6%
 hydro: 92.4%
 other: 0% (2001)
 nuclear: 0%

Oil:
 production:  (2001 est.)
 consumption:  (2001 est.)
 exports: NA
 imports: NA

Natural gas:
 production: 16 million m³ (2001 est.)
 consumption: 2.016 billion m³ (2001 est.)
 exports: 0 m³ (2001 est.)
 imports: 2 billion m³ (2001 est.)

Current account balance:
$-87.92 million (2004 est.)

Exports - commodities:
cotton, wool, meat, tobacco; gold, mercury, uranium, natural gas, hydropower; machinery; shoes

Imports - commodities:
oil and gas, machinery and equipment, chemicals, foodstuffs

Reserves of foreign exchange & gold:
$498.7 million (2004 est.)

Exchange rates:
soms per US dollar - 41.731 (2004), 43.6484 (2003), 46.9371 (2002), 48.378 (2001), 47.7038 (2000), 69.85 (2020)

See also

Kyrgyzstan
Economy of Asia

References

External links
 Minister wants bigger role for local mining firms
 Kyrgyz-North America Trade Council, New York USA
 American Chamber of Commerce in Kyrgyz Republic, Bishkek
 International Business Council, Bishkek
 Bishkek Business Club
 Kyrgyzstan: Kyrgyzstan has great potential to become a center of organic production in Central Asia
 Tariffs applied by Kyrgyzstan as provided by ITC's Market Access Map, an online database of customs tariffs and market requirements.

 
Kyrgyzstan